Kopylovo is a rural locality (a village) and the administrative center of Rezhskoye Rural Settlement, Syamzhensky District, Vologda Oblast, Russia. The population was 115 as of 2002. There are 2 streets.

Geography 
Kopylovo is located 42 km northeast of Syamzha (the district's administrative centre) by road. Korobitsyno is the nearest rural locality.

References 

Rural localities in Syamzhensky District